Rico or RICO may refer to:

Places in the United States
Rico, California
Rico, Colorado, a town
Rico, Georgia
Rico, North Carolina
Rico, Pennsylvania

People and fictional characters
Rico (name), a name and list of people and fictional characters with the given name, nickname or surname
Rico (Scottish singer)
Rico Rodriguez (musician), known simply as Rico
Rico (footballer) or Enrico dos Santos, Brazilian footballer
Salah Atef, Egyptian footballer known as Rico

Music
Rico International, a manufacturer of reeds, mouthpieces, and woodwind accessories
"Rico" (song), a 1998 song the Matthew Good Band from Underdogs
"R.I.C.O." (song), a 2015 song by Meek Mill
Rico, a 2000 album by Matt Bianco
Rico, a 2018 album by Berner

Other uses
Reeves Instrument Corporation, a military manufacturer
Rico (dog) (1994–2008), Border Collie noted for its intelligence
Racketeer Influenced and Corrupt Organizations Act or RICO, a United States law targeting organized crime
"RICO" (Better Call Saul), a 2015 episode of Better Call Saul named after the law
RICO and its sequel RICO: London, first-person shooter video games; see List of Nintendo Switch games (Q–Z)

See also
Rico Suave (disambiguation)